Heidegger may refer to:
 Heidegger (surname) 
 Martin Heidegger (1889–1976), a German philosopher 
 Johann Heinrich Heidegger (1633-1698), a Swiss theologian 
 Heidegger, a philosophical body of work encompassed by Heidegger Gesamtausgabe 

In fictional characters:
 Heidegger, a character in Final Fantasy VII
 Heidegger, a character in "Dr. Heidegger's Experiment", a short story by Nathaniel Hawthorne